Protohydra is a genus of cnidarians belonging to the family Protohydridae.

The species of this genus are found in Europe and Northern America.

Species:

Protohydra caulleryi 
Protohydra leuckarti

References

Protohydridae
Hydrozoan genera